Jago  is a player character in the Killer Instinct fighting game series created by Rare. Introduced in the original Killer Instinct in 1994, he has appeared in every entry in the series to date. A monk who fights with the aid of a mysterious tiger spirit, Jago is the male protagonist of the series, along with his older sister Orchid.

Appearances 
Jago is a Tibetan monk and a powerful warrior. Abandoned as a baby, he was found by the Monks of the Tiger, an order who worship an ancient deity known as the Tiger Spirit, and raised in their monastery as one of their pupils. Over the years, Jago matures into one of the Order's finest students until he is one day visited by the Tiger Spirit during meditation. The Tiger Spirit chooses him as its champion and grants him new power, ordering him to enter the first Killer Instinct tournament and destroy Ultratech. Though nearly overwhelmed by the Tiger Spirit's power, Jago follows orders and helps to bring down Ultratech, destroying Fulgore in the process.

However, in Killer Instinct 2, Jago is betrayed by the Tiger Spirit, who reveals itself to have been the demon Gargos all along, having used Jago to gain entrance to the physical world. Jago seeks revenge for Gargos' manipulation and defeats both him and Fulgore, who was revived with the sole purpose of killing Jago. In the aftermath, Jago seemingly defeats and banishes Gargos and discovers that Orchid is his sister, the two having been separated when their parents were murdered shortly after Jago's birth.

In the reboot, Jago is the son of Orchid's military father, Jacob, and a foreign aid worker in Pakistan with whom he had an affair. Shortly after Jago's birth, his mother disappears with him into the Himalayas, and he is later found abandoned by the Monks of the Tiger. The monks raise Jago from birth and train him in combat, but he isolates himself after killing a fellow warrior possessed by an evil spirit in self-defense. Meditating in a mountain cave, he is visited by the Tiger Spirit and infused with his power. The Spirit orders him to destroy Ultratech by participating in the Killer Instinct tournament, and Jago complies, though he worries when the Spirit becomes more bloodthirsty, nearly causing him to murder his long-lost sister Orchid. Following the tournament, Jago discovers the Spirit is actually Gargos. Jago experiences a crisis of faith and tries to exorcise Gargos's influence from within him by seeking out the strongest of opponents. This crisis of faith is symbolized through his new costume, which consists of various materials cannibalized from the now abandoned Tiger Shrine, including tiles (arm guards), bits of broken statues (knee pads), drapery, and ropes from a chandelier (leg bindings and harness). However, Jago succumbs to the corruption, allowing Omen to possess him and transforming him into Shadow Jago. Eventually, Jago fights back against his possession, and Omen is forced to abandon Jago's body, though his time spent in Jago's body gives him enough strength to manifest on the mortal plane and he escapes. Jago later joins Maya's rebel force alongside Orchid and T.J. Combo, planning to defeat both Ultratech and Gargos, but they are trapped by Ultratech forces at Maya's headquarters in the Andes while ARIA's plan to summon Gargos is brought to fruition. Ultimately, Jago and the others ally with ARIA in order to stop Gargos from conquering Earth.

Jago also appears in the 1996 Killer Instinct and Killer Instinct Special comics, along with the 2017-2018 Killer Instinct miniseries from Dynamite Comics.

Shadow Jago 
The 2013 game also features a new version of the character called Shadow Jago, an altered version of Jago who is under the possession of Omen, Gargos's herald. Following Omen's expulsion from Jago's body, Shadow Jago manifests as his own separate being and becomes a minion of Gargos.

Initially, Shadow Jago was only available as a playable character for those who purchased a 12-month Xbox Live membership during the launch of the Xbox One, controlling identically to Jago but with some visual and vocal differences. In Season One's story mode, he was included as a secret boss possessing both new moves and an Ultimate Combo, becoming the only character to receive one until a 2017 update. Following a successful fundraiser, the playable version was reworked and given a unique move set based on his boss incarnation. The updated version of Shadow Jago was released in December 2015, and the character became permanently available for purchase by all players in April 2016.

Reception 
The character was well received. According to GamesRadar, "this sword-wielding warrior monk is basically the Ryu of KI: a poster boy with an accessible move set and a noble cause. Jago's specials will be instantly recognizable to any fighting game fan." Jago was ranked as the tenth top ninja in gaming by GameTrailers in 2007. Complex ranked him the ninth-swiftest ninja in video games in 2012,.

References 

Fictional Buddhist monks
Fictional Hei Hu Quan practitioners
Fictional kenjutsuka
Fictional Tibetan people
Killer Instinct characters
Male characters in video games
Microsoft protagonists
Ninja characters in video games
Religious worker characters in video games
Video game characters introduced in 1994
Video game characters who use magic